The Johns Hopkins School of Education is one of nine academic divisions of the Johns Hopkins University. Established as a separate school in 2007, its origins can be traced back to the 1909 founding of Johns Hopkins’ College Courses for Teachers, later renamed College for Teachers. It was ranked first in the nation among graduate schools of education in 2015 by U.S. News & World Report.

Program offerings, including both online and face-to-face, range from initial licensure master's degrees for those entering the teaching profession to advanced doctoral level research designed to prepare future scholars to address preK – 12 policies and practice challenges from early childhood to the adult learner.

The School's three centers – the Center for Research and Reform in Education, the Center for Social Organization of Schools, and the Center for Technology in Education – are home to some of the nation's most recognized academics and practitioners in educational research and among the top recipients of U. S. Department of Education grants for programs aimed at improving educational outcomes for students. The Johns Hopkins School of Education is accredited by the Council for the Accreditation of Educator Preparation (CAEP), formerly the National Council for Accreditation of Teacher Education, and the Council for Accreditation of Counseling and Related Educational Programs (CACREP). All programs leading to certification are approved by the Maryland State Department of Education. The Johns Hopkins University is accredited by the Middle States Commission on Higher Education (MSCHE).

Academic departments
Teacher Preparation
Teacher Development and Leadership
Special Education
Counseling and Human Services
Interdisciplinary Studies in Education (DISE)
Division of Public Safety Leadership (PSL)

Research centers
Center for Research and Reform in Education
Center for Safe and Healthy Schools
Center for Social Organization of Schools
Center for Technology in Education
Institute for Innovation in Development, Engagement, and Learning Systems (IDEALS)

Controversy

In 2022, several former students in the school's Counseling program accused the program of discrimination after their dismissals. In response, Dean Morphew wrote a letter to the JHU News-Letter defending the program and professors named, and asked the News-Letter to retract their article. The situation was covered by Inside Higher Ed in April of 2022.

References

External links
Official website
dismissals

April of 2022

School of Education
Schools of education in Maryland
Educational institutions established in 1909
1909 establishments in Maryland